Leucetta chagosensis is a species of calcareous sponge in the family Leucettidae, and was first described in 1913 by Arthur Dendy. The species epithet, chagosensis, comes from the Latin with the ending -ensis indicating that the species comes from the Chagos archipeligo in the Indian Ocean. The taxonomic decision for synonymy is based on Maurice Burton (1963).

Distribution
It is found in Queensland and Western Australian coastal waters,  in coastal waters of the Indian and the western Pacific Ocean, where the water temperature ranges from 20 to 30 C, the depth from 0–50 m, and salinities from 30 to 35 PSU.

References

Taxa named by Arthur Dendy
Clathrinida
Animals described in 1913